ICHS may refer to:
 Ilford County High School, Ilford, England 
 Immaculate Conception High School (disambiguation)
 Inveralmond Community High School, Livingston, Scotland
 Indian Creek High School (Wintersville, Ohio), United States
 InTech Collegiate High School, North Logan, Utah, United States
 Integrative Center for Homeland Security, at Texas A&M University